

This is a detailed table of the National Register of Historic Places listing in Martin County, Indiana.

This is intended to be a detailed table of the property on the National Register of Historic Places in Martin County, Indiana, United States. Latitude and longitude coordinates are provided for many National Register properties and districts; these locations may be seen together in a map.

There are 2 properties listed on the National Register in the county.

Current listing

|}

See also
 List of National Historic Landmarks in Indiana
 National Register of Historic Places listings in Indiana
 Listings in neighboring counties: Daviess, Dubois, Greene, Lawrence, Orange
 List of Indiana state historical markers in Martin County

References

 
Martin County